Dingyuan Township is a township under the administration of Qu County in Sichuan, China. , it has one residential community and seven villages under its administration.

See also 
 List of township-level divisions of Sichuan

References 

Township-level divisions of Sichuan
Qu County